Mesut Kurtis is a Turkish–Macedonian singer who is represented by and signed to Awakening Records. He has released four albums namely "Salawat", "Beloved", "Tabassam", and "Balaghal Ula" and one mini album namely "Azeem Al-Shan".

Background and education
Kurtis was born in Skopje, North Macedonia. His parents are Turkish. He studied at the College of Skopje and came to the UK at a young age to pursue his studies. He graduated with a degree in Human Sciences, Islamic Law and Jurisprudence from the European Institute of Human Sciences, University of Wales.

Kurtis comes from a scholarly and religious family. His father and grandfather were fluent in Classical Arabic.

Career

Kurtis showed a strong interest in Islamic nasheeds from a very young age. He joined several nasheed groups in Macedonia that performed local and also made several international visits including performances in Turkey and neighbouring places. His music is influenced by Sufi, Turkish classical, Arabic and European styles.

In May 2004, his debut album Salawat, produced by Awakening Records, was released and  featured songs that combine Arabic, Turkish and English. It was well received by Muslim listeners around the world after his first music video "Al‐Burdah" which was filmed on location in the islands off the coast of Turkey.

In June 2009, his second album Beloved was released. On 7 July 2014, his third album Tabassam was released.

Kurtis sings in Arabic, English, Macedonian and Turkish. He is also fluent in five languages.

Philanthropy

 On 14 April 2012, Kurtis took part in "Send A Little Hope" charity concert organised by Awakening Records and Save An Orphan organization at London's Hammersmith Apollo with Hamza Namira, Irfan Makki, Maher Zain and Raef to raise awareness and collect donations. Over £175,000 were pledged on the night.
 On 21 April 2012, Kurtis performed at University City Hall by Sharjah City for Humanitarian Services in collaboration with the American University of Sharjah with Maher Zain in the charity concert aiming at introducing youth to disability issues and emphasising the importance of voluntarily work.
 Kurtis took part in "Sound of Light 2014" tour organized by Awakening Records and Human Appeal International in France and UK to collect fund for Gaza. A concert in Bradford, England raised £520,000.

Discography

Albums

Mini album

Videography
2019: "Balaghal Ula"
2014: "Aşkınla Yansın Özüm"
2014: "Rouhi Fidak"
2012: "Sevgili"
2009: "Beloved"
2007: "Burdah"
2022: "Hasbi Rabbi"
2022: "Burdah" Remake

See also
Maher Zain
Hamza Namira
Raef
Humood Alkhudher

References

External links

Living people
1981 births
Macedonian expatriates in England
Macedonian people of Turkish descent
21st-century Macedonian male singers
Arabic-language singers
Turkish-language singers
Urdu-language singers
21st-century British male singers
Macedonian-language singers
Performers of Islamic music
Musicians from Skopje
Alumni of the University of Wales, Lampeter
Awakening Music artists
Turkish Sunni Muslims